This is a list of radio stations in Kannada.

Bengaluru

See also

 List of FM radio stations in Bangalore
 Media in Karnataka
 List of Kannada films
 List of Kannada magazines
 List of Kannada newspapers
 List of Kannada television channels
 List of radio stations in India

References

Lists of radio stations in India
Lists of radio stations by language
Radio stations